The Diocese of Cyprus and the Gulf is one of four dioceses in the Episcopal Church in Jerusalem and the Middle East, a province in the Anglican Communion. It covers Cyprus and the Arabian Peninsula, Iraq and Yemen. The bishop in Cyprus and the Gulf is the Ordinary of the diocese. In every part of the diocese, except in Cyprus and Iraq, the congregations are largely expatriate, with many Christians from Pakistan, India, Sri Lanka, the Philippines and the African continent. The diocese is linked with the Diocese of Exeter in England and the Diocese of Thika in Kenya. The diocese is divided into the Archdeaconry of Cyprus and the Archdeaconry of the Gulf: Christopher Futcher was collated archdeacon in Cyprus on 7 September 2019.  The Rev'd Canon Dr. Michael Mbona, a Zimbabwean serving at St. Paul's in Kuwait, was appointed as Archdeacon for the Gulf, following the retirement of long-serving Archdeacon Bill Schwartz, OBE.

List of bishops in Cyprus and the Persian Gulf

(Any dates appearing in italics indicate de facto  continuation of office.  The start date of tenure below is the date of appointment or succession. Where known, the date of installation and ordination as bishop are listed in the notes together with the post held prior to appointment.)

Churches 
Gulf Churches

United Arab Emirates

 Christ Church, Jebel Ali 
 Holy Trinity Church, Dubai
 St Luke Church, Ras Al Khaimah
 St Martin Church, Sharjah
 St Nicholas' Church, Fujairah
 St Andrew Church, Abu Dhabi
 St Thomas Church, Al Ain

Kuwait

 St Paul Church - Kuwait

Qatar

 Church of the Epiphany, Doha - Qatar

Bahrain

 St Christopher’s and Awali Church, Bahrain

Yemen

 Christ Church, Aden, Yemen

Cyprus

 St. Barnabas church, Limassol
 St Helena Church, Larnaca
 St Lazarus Church, Pissouri
 St Paul’s Cathedral, Nicosia
 St Andrew’s Church Kyrenia
 Christ Church Ayia Napa
 St Mark Church, Famagusta
 Anglican Church of Paphos

See also

Chaplaincy of Dubai, Sharjah and the Northern Emirates
The Mission to Seafarers

References

Sources
Who’s Who 2008 London, A&C Black, 2007

External links
Anglican Diocese of Cyprus and the Gulf
Christ Church Jebel Ali, Dubai
St Andrews Church, Abu Dhabi
The Flying Angel, Fujairah
St Paul's Church, Kuwait
St George's Baghdad, Iraq
Church of the Epiphany, Qatar
St Christopher's Cathedral, Bahrain
The Protestant Church in Oman
The Canterbury Group
Christ Church Aden, Yemen
Diocese of Cyprus and the Gulf - Union Between Christians

Lists of Anglican bishops and archbishops
 
Cyprus religion-related lists
Anglican Diocese of Cyprus
Anglicanism in Europe
Anglicanism in the Middle East
Anglican dioceses established in the 20th century
Cyprus and the Gulf
Anglican